Cecil William Holmes (23 June 1921 – 24 August 1994) was a New Zealand-born film director and writer.

Biography 
Holmes was born in Waipukurau, Hawke's Bay, New Zealand. He served in the Royal New Zealand Air Force and British Royal Navy during World War II before turning to filmmaking. He made a number of documentaries for the New Zealand National Film Unit then moved to Australia, where he directed several feature films and a number of documentaries for the Commonwealth Film Unit.

The Cecil Holmes Award given by the Australian Directors Guild is named after him. The Award was instigated in 1995, and is presented by the ADG board from time to time to honour recipients who have advocated for the role of the director.

His second wife was author and Indigenous advocate Sandra Le Brun Holmes who contributed an account of the experience of their making I, the Aboriginal  to Walkabout, a magazine for which Holmes himself also wrote.

Selected filmography 
Captain Thunderbolt (1953) - director
Words for Freedom (1953) (documentary) - director
Three in One (1957) - director
Lotu (1962) (documentary) - director
 I, The Aboriginal (documentary) - director
Faces in the Sun (1964) (documentary) - director
Gentle Strangers (1972) - director
The Killing of Angel Street (1981) - writer

Screenplays 
Feature Film Screenplays (unrealised) 'Call Me By My Proper Name' (true story of the man hunt for Australian Aboriginal Larrey Boy in the Northern Territory of Australia)
Mackie's in Town (screenplay of the true story of Pat Mackie, leader of Mt. Isa Mines Strike of 1964)
Morrison of Peking (screenplay based upon book by Australian writer Cyril Pearl, 1967)
The Planter of Malaita (screenplay of a Joseph Conrad novella)

Books  

One Man's Way, (autobiography) Penguin, 1986
Mask Of Smiles, 1994 (Holmes' journey into the Philippines), completed yet unpublished at time of his death.

References

External links 
 
 Cecil Holmes profile at Australian Screen Online
 Cecil Holmes at the National Film and Sound Archive
 Cecil Holmes at Dictionary of New Zealand Biography
 Cecil Holmes Bibliography at Australian Film Institute

Australian film directors
1921 births
1994 deaths
New Zealand trade unionists
People from Waipukurau
New Zealand communists
New Zealand military personnel of World War II
Royal Navy personnel of World War II